The Jesse Edwards House is a historic house in Newberg, Oregon, United States. Built by Jesse Edwards, the "Father of Newberg" and one of the founders of George Fox University, it is the second-oldest residence in the city, after the Hoover-Minthorn House.

When Jesse Edwards died, his family purchased the home.  In 1998, they sold it to George Fox University to house university presidents, for which it was restored.

References 
 Historical buildings at georgefox.edu

Houses completed in 1883
Houses on the National Register of Historic Places in Oregon
National Register of Historic Places in Yamhill County, Oregon
Buildings and structures in Newberg, Oregon
George Fox University
1883 establishments in Oregon
Houses in Yamhill County, Oregon